Sinibrama is a small genus of cyprinid fishes, the five currently recognized species distributed in south China, Taiwan, Laos, and Vietnam. These are silvery fishes with deep, laterally compressed bodies, large eyes, and terminal mouths. They tend to grow no larger than 20 cm in standard length.

The taxonomy of the group is frequently disputed, as all forms are very similar with more or less overlapping morphometric data.

Species 
The genus contains these species:
 Sinibrama affinis (Vaillant, 1892)
 Sinibrama longianalis Z. G. Xie, C. X. Xie & E. Zhang, 2003
 Sinibrama macrops (Günther, 1868)
 Sinibrama melrosei (Nichols & C. H. Pope, 1927)
 Sinibrama taeniatus (Nichols, 1941)
 Sinibrama wui (Rendahl (de), 1932)

References 
 

 
Cultrinae
Fish of Asia